Arataki Visitor Centre is a tourism and education centre in West Auckland, New Zealand, often described as the gateway to the Waitākere Ranges. The centre provides information about the Waitākere Ranges, and organises educational events.

History 

The Arataki Nature Trail, located near the site of the visitor centre, was first opened in 1974. The name Arataki is a Māori language word, meaning an "instructional path".

The visitor centre was opened in 1994, with a design by Harry Turbott. The carved pou at the entrance of the centre depicts the ancestors of Te Kawerau ā Maki, including Tiriwā (the namesake of the Waitākere Ranges name in Māori, Te Wao Nui a Tiriwa), followed by Rakatāura / Hape (tohunga of the Tainui), Hoturoa, Maki (the namesake ancestor of Te Kawerau ā Maki) and his son and grandson. The pou was removed in 2009 due to damage to the wood, and was replaced with a new pou constructed from fallen kauri from the Waitākere Ranges.

In late 2017, Te Kawerau ā Maki placed a rāhui on the tracks of the Waitākere Ranges, due to the effects of Kauri dieback on the forest, followed by a formal closure of the tracks by Auckland Council in April 2018. The upper Arataki Nature Trail was one of the first tracks to reopen after track upgrades, in May 2018.

Facility

The Arataki Visitor Centre is the start point for the Hillary Trail, a multi-day walk through the Waitākere Ranges to Muriwai which opened in January 2010. As of 2023, the full track remains closed due to the effects of Kauri dieback.

The visitor centre is also used as a gallery space, such as for nature photography, and fibre installations by New Zealand weaver Maureen Lander.

References

External links 
Official Facebook page

1994 establishments in New Zealand
1990s architecture in New Zealand
Buildings and structures in Auckland
Te Kawerau ā Maki
Waitākere Ranges Local Board Area
West Auckland, New Zealand
Event venues in New Zealand
Nature centers
Tourist attractions in Auckland